Robert Black Smith (July 12, 1872 – January 29, 1931) was a Canadian politician. He served in the Legislative Assembly of New Brunswick from 1917 to 1925 as member of the Liberal party. He died in 1931.

References 

1866 births
1931 deaths
New Brunswick Liberal Association MLAs